South Stanley is a village in County Durham, in England. It is situated immediately to the south of Stanley.

References

Villages in County Durham
Stanley, County Durham